The Montenegrin Men's Handball First League (Montenegrin: Crnogorska prva muška rukometna liga) is the top men's team handball league in Montenegro. It is organized by the Handball Federation of Montenegro.

History

Before independence
During the history, many Montenegrin clubs played in the SFR Yugoslavia / FR Yugoslavia / Serbia and Montenegro First Handball League. Among them were RK Lovćen, RK Budućnost, RK Mornar, RK Rudar and RK Berane.
First Montenegrin team which played in Yugoslav First League is Rudar, which debuted in the top-tier on season 1964–65. More than 20 years passed until next teams from Montenegro played in the top-tier. At the end of nineties, member of First League became Lovćen, and at the beginning of nineties Budućnost and Mornar. On season 1994–95, third-placed Mornar gained participation in EHF Cities Cup 1995–96 and that was the first ever performance of some Montenegrin side in European competitions.
From season 1996–97, started the domination of Lovćen – who won two champion titles in FR Yugoslavia (1999–2000; 2000–01), with two consecutive seasons in EHF Champions League. On season 2000–01, Lovćen played in Champions League quarterfinals, against THW Kiel (29–24; 22–35). That was the greatest result of some Montenegrin handball team in European competitions.
During the new century, except Lovćen, in the First League of FR Yugoslavia played Rudar (at that time under the name Pljevlja), Berane and Budućnost.

Below is the list of performances of Montenegrin clubs in Yugoslav Handball League with final placements on each season.

The only Montenegrin club who gained trophies in Yugoslav League was RK Lovćen. They gained two champion titles, with four finishes as a runner-up of championship.
Below is the list of Montenegrin clubs' champion titles in the First League of Yugoslavia.

After independence
Soon after the Montenegrin independence referendum, Handball Federation of Montenegro founded its own competitions, with the First League as a top-tier competition. During the history, RK Lovćen was most successful side and participated three times on regional SEHA League.
In the league participate eight or ten clubs, and the season have two parts. During the first part, there are 14 or 18 legs, after which are forming two groups – TOP4 (league for the champion) and league for relegation.
First League is one of three men's handball competitions in Montenegro. Other high level competition is Montenegrin Cup.

Period 2006–2015
First title holder in independent Montenegro was RK Lovćen, who won the trophy on season 2006–07. Their biggest opponent at the time was RK Berane, who won the champions' battle during the next season.
Next two years saw the domination of RK Budućnost from Podgorica, who won two consecutive titles. Big incidents occurred at the games during both seasons. Match RK Budućnost – RK Lovćen, which decided about national champion, played on 17 May 2009, was the most attended game in the history of Montenegrin First League (4,000 spectators). Budućnost won 28:26 (18:14) and held the first title in the club history. Match ended with incidents in Sports center 'Morača', with the clash of supporters, but the players Goran Đukanović (Budućnost) and Igor Marković (Lovćen) too. Big crowd disturbances previously happened at the game RK Berane – RK Lovćen.
RK Budućnost was dissolved during the summer 2010. During the season 2010–11, RK Brskovo (at that time under the name RK Mojkovac) gained their first-ever trophy, after title race with RK Lovćen.
From 2011 to 2015, RK Lovćen won four consecutive titles. At that time, team from Cetinje played three seasons in SEHA League, while RK Sutjeska participated once.

Period 2016–
With poor performances of RK Lovćen and following earlier relegations of many notable teams as RK Berane or RK Sutjeska, title holder on season 2015–16 was RK Budvanska rivijera. Next season, the trophy won RK Partizan from Tivat.
New time of RK Lovćen domination started in 2017. Team from Cetinje won two consecutive trophies in seasons 2017–18 and 2018–19.
Season 2019–20 was interrupted after 12 weeks, due to coronavirus pandemic. During the April, Montenegrin national handball federation decided to erase all the results in every single competition. But, after the consultations with the First League members in May, federation changed the decision, so the table after 13 weeks became a final score of the season. With that decision, RK Lovćen won the title, while RK Komovi became a runner-up.

Champions 
From the inaugural season (2006–07), five different clubs won the champion title in Montenegrin First League.

Titles by season

Titles by Club

Montenegrin League 
Since 2006, six different clubs won the trophy of the Montenegrin handball champion. 

The most successful club is RK Lovćen Cetinje with 9 titles, while RK Budućnost Podgorica and RK Budvanska rivijera have won 2 titles. RK Brskovo, RK Berane and RK Partizan Tivat all have a single championship title.

With 2 titles from FR Yugoslavia Championship (2000, 2001), two times winner of the FRY Cup (2002, 2003), 9 titles in Montenegrin league and 12 wins in Montenegrin Cup, RK Lovćen is the most successful club of Montenegro.

Overall 
Below is an overall list, with titles won in both leagues – Montenegrin League and FR Yugoslavia / Serbia and Montenegro Championship.

Performances by clubs

Seasons
During the past, in Montenegrin First League participated 17 different teams. Only one club competed in the all seasons – Lovćen.

Final placements
Below is the list of participants of the First League with their placements during the every single season.

All-time table
All-time Montenegrin First League table is a ranking of all Montenegrin handball clubs based on their performance in top tier. In this ranking 2 points are awarded for a win, 1 for a draw, and 0 for a loss. Highlighted clubs played in the First League in the 2019/20 season.

Including the season 2020/21

Attendances by season

M = Number of matches (only matches with spectators counted); H = Highest attendance on one match; CH = Club with highest average attendance; CL = Club with lowest average attendance

Current season
At the first part of competition, nine teams play a two-round robin competition. In second phase, four best-placed teams are playing six-weeks long League for champion, while all the others are participating in playout. 
The following clubs compete in the First League during the 2020–21 season.

Montenegrin handball clubs in SEHA League
Southeastern European Handball Association League, or SEHA League is founded at 2011, and Montenegrin clubs were part of it since first season. Most successful Montenegrin representative in regional league was RK Lovćen. 
Below is list of participation of Montenegrin clubs by every season of SEHA League.

Montenegrin handball clubs in European competitions

Montenegrin men's handball clubs are participating in the EHF competitions since the season 1995–96. 
First team which ever competed at the European cups was Mornar Bar and most successful Montenegrin represent in the European competitions is Lovćen Cetinje. The other Montenegrin clubs which competed at the EHF competitions are Berane, Rudar Pljevlja, Budućnost Podgorica, Sutjeska Nikšić, Brskovo and RK Budvanska rivijera.
The greatest result in the European cups made RK Lovćen during the season 2000–01. As a champion of FR Yugoslavia, Lovćen won fifth place in the EHF Champions League.
Below is a list of Montenegrin teams which played in the European competitions.
{|  class="wikitable sortable" 
!width="190"|Club
!width="20"|S
!width="20"|G
!width="20"|W
!width="20"|D
!width="20"|L
!GD
!width="20"|Pts
|-
|Lovćen Cetinje
|align = "center"|20
|align = "center"| 73
|align = "center"| 27
|align = "center"| 4
|align = "center"| 42
|align = "center"| 1860:1984
|align = "center"| 56
|-
|Berane
|align = "center"|4
|align = "center"| 16
|align = "center"| 10
|align = "center"| 0
|align = "center"| 6
|align = "center"| 459:453
|align = "center"| 20
|-
|Budućnost Podgorica
|align = "center"|2
|align = "center"| 16
|align = "center"| 9
|align = "center"| 2
|align = "center"| 5
|align = "center"| 483:450
|align = "center"| 20
|-
|Sutjeska Nikšić
|align = "center"|5
|align = "center"| 14
|align = "center"| 3
|align = "center"| 2
|align = "center"| 9
|align = "center"| 323:372
|align = "center"| 11
|-
|Mornar Bar
|align = "center"|4
|align = "center"| 10
|align = "center"| 4
|align = "center"| 0
|align = "center"| 6
|align = "center"| 282:280
|align = "center"| 8
|-
|Brskovo Mojkovac
|align = "center"|4
|align = "center"| 10
|align = "center"| 3
|align = "center"| 0
|align = "center"| 7
|align = "center"| 200:274
|align = "center"| 6
|-
|Partizan Tivat
|align = "center"|3
|align = "center"| 8
|align = "center"| 1
|align = "center"| 3
|align = "center"| 4
|align = "center"| 187:231
|align = "center"| 5
|-
|Rudar Pljevlja
|align = "center"|1
|align = "center"| 4
|align = "center"| 2
|align = "center"| 0
|align = "center"| 2
|align = "center"| 97:114
|align = "center"| 4
|-
|RK Budvanska rivijera
|align = "center"|3
|align = "center"| 6
|align = "center"| 0
|align = "center"| 0
|align = "center"| 6
|align = "center"| 135:171
|align = "center"| 0
|-
|Jedinstvo Bijelo Polje
|align = "center"|1
|align = "center"| 2
|align = "center"| 0
|align = "center"| 0
|align = "center"| 2
|align = "center"| 46:73
|align = "center"| 0
|- class="sortbottom"
|align = "center"|10 TEAMS
|align = "center"| 
|align = "center"| 159
|align = "center"| 59
|align = "center"| 11
|align = "center"| 89
|align = "center"| 4072:4402
|align = "center"| 129
|}

S – seasons; G – games; W – wins; D – draws; L – losses; GD – goal difference; Pts – points (win = 2pts; draw = 1)

See also
 Montenegrin handball clubs in European competitions
 Montenegrin Second League of Men's Handball
 Montenegrin Men's Handball Cup
 Montenegrin First League of Women's Handball

References

External links
Handball Federation of Montenegro

Handball leagues in Montenegro
Montenegrin handball clubs